Vĩnh Long is a city and the capital of Vĩnh Long Province in Vietnam's Mekong Delta. The name was spelled 永隆 ("eternal prosperity") in the former Hán Nôm writing system.

Location
A number of canals run through Vĩnh Long, with tall vehicular bridges crossing them. Transport by boat is possible, although parts of the town, particularly An Binh, become unreachable at low tide.

Vĩnh Long is about two hours from the large city of Cần Thơ in the adjacent Hậu Giang Province, and about three hours from Saigon. The floating market town of Cái Bè is on the other side of the An Binh island and is the frequent destination for tourist boats from Vĩnh Long.

See also
 Vĩnh Long Airfield

References

Districts of Vĩnh Long province
Provincial capitals in Vietnam
Cities in Vietnam